The following outline is provided as an overview of and introduction to Barbados:

Barbados – sovereign island country in the Lesser Antilles. It is one of the Caribbean's leading tourist destinations and is one of the most developed islands in the region.

General reference

 Pronunciation:
 Barbadian English: 
 British English: 
 American English: 
 Pronunciation:
 Common English country name:  Barbados
 Official English country name:  Barbados
 Common endonym(s):  
 Official endonym(s):  
 Adjectival(s): Barbadian
 Demonym(s):
 Etymology: Name of Barbados
 International rankings of Barbados
 International Telecommunication Union callsign prefix: 8P
 ISO country codes: BB, BRB, 052
 ISO region codes: See ISO 3166-2:BB
 Internet country code top-level domain: .bb

Geography of Barbados 

Geography of Barbados
 Barbados is...
 an island
 a country
 an island country
 a nation state
 a republic in the Commonwealth of Nations
 Coastline:  97 km
 Population of Barbados:  287,711 - 174th most populous country

 Area of Barbados:  - 199th largest country
 Atlas of Barbados

Location of Barbados 
 Barbados is located within the following regions:
 Northern Hemisphere and Western Hemisphere
 North America (though not on the mainland, just north of South America, off the coast of Venezuela)
 Atlantic Ocean
 North Atlantic
 West Indies
 Southern Caribbean
 Antilles
 Lesser Antilles
 Time zone:  Atlantic Standard Time 
 Extreme points of Barbados
 Northernmost point – North Point, Saint Lucy (N 13.334851, W -59.614742)
 Southernmost point – South Point, Christ Church (N 13.045294, W -59.526722)
 Easternmost point – Kitridge Point, Saint Philip (N 13.149207, W -59.420292)
 Westernmost point – Harrisons, Saint Lucy, Saint Lucy (N 13.305756, W -59.651022)
 High:  Mount Hillaby 
 Low:  North Atlantic Ocean 0 m
 Land boundaries:  none

Environment of Barbados 

 Climate of Barbados
 List of Barbados hurricanes
 Wildlife of Barbados
 Barbados Wildlife Reserve
 Fauna of Barbados
 Amphibians and reptiles of Barbados
 Birds of Barbados
 Mammals of Barbados

Natural geographic features of Barbados 

 Beaches in Barbados
 Islands of Barbados
 Rivers of Barbados
 World Heritage Sites in Barbados: Bridgetown

Regions of Barbados 

Regions of Barbados
 English place names in Barbados

Ecoregions of Barbados 

List of ecoregions in Barbados

Administrative divisions of Barbados 

Administrative divisions of Barbados
 Parishes of Barbados
 Christ Church
 Saint Andrew
 Saint George
 Saint James
 Saint John
 Saint Joseph
 Saint Lucy
 Saint Michael
 Saint Peter
 Saint Philip
 Saint Thomas

Municipalities of Barbados 
 Cities, towns and villages in Barbados

Demography of Barbados 

Demographics of Barbados

Government and politics of Barbados 

Politics of Barbados
 Form of government: constitutional monarchy and a parliamentary government with  strong democratic traditions
 Capital of Barbados: Bridgetown
 Elections in Barbados
 Political parties in Barbados

Branches of government

Politics of Barbados

Executive branch of the government of Barbados 

Government of Barbados
 Head of state: President of Barbados
 Head of government: Prime Minister of Barbados
 Cabinet of Barbados
 Ministries and agencies of the Barbados government
 Ministry of Foreign Affairs, Foreign Trade and International Business (Barbados)

Legislative branch of the government of Barbados 

 Parliament of Barbados (bicameral)
 Upper house: Senate of Barbados
 Lower house: Barbados House of Assembly

Judicial branch of the government of Barbados 

Court system of Barbados
Judiciary of Barbados
 Caribbean Court of Justice
 Supreme Court of Barbados

Foreign relations of Barbados 

Foreign relations of Barbados
 Diplomatic missions in Barbados
 Diplomatic missions of Barbados
 Relations with specific countries
 Australia–Barbados relations
 Barbados–Brazil relations
 Barbados–Canada relations
 Barbados–China relations
 Barbados–France Maritime Delimitation Agreement
 Barbados–France relations
 Barbados–Germany relations
 Barbados–Grenada relations
 Barbados–Guyana relations
 Barbados–India relations
 Barbados–Japan relations
 Barbados–Nigeria relations
 Barbados–Suriname relations
 Barbados–Trinidad and Tobago relations
 Barbados–United Kingdom relations
 Barbados–United States relations
 Embassy of Barbados in Washington, D.C.

International organization membership 
Barbados is a member of:

African, Caribbean, and Pacific Group of States (ACP)
Agency for the Prohibition of Nuclear Weapons in Latin America and the Caribbean (OPANAL)
Caribbean Community and Common Market (Caricom)
Caribbean Development Bank (CDB)
Commonwealth of Nations
Food and Agriculture Organization (FAO)
Group of 77 (G77)
Inter-American Development Bank (IADB)
International Bank for Reconstruction and Development (IBRD)
International Civil Aviation Organization (ICAO)
International Criminal Court (ICCt)
International Criminal Police Organization (Interpol)
International Development Association (IDA)
International Federation of Red Cross and Red Crescent Societies (IFRCS)
International Finance Corporation (IFC)
International Fund for Agricultural Development (IFAD)
International Labour Organization (ILO)
International Maritime Organization (IMO)
International Monetary Fund (IMF)
International Olympic Committee (IOC)
International Organization for Standardization (ISO)

International Red Cross and Red Crescent Movement (ICRM)
International Telecommunication Union (ITU)
International Telecommunications Satellite Organization (ITSO)
International Trade Union Confederation (ITUC)
Latin American Economic System (LAES)
Multilateral Investment Guarantee Agency (MIGA)
Nonaligned Movement (NAM)
Organisation for the Prohibition of Chemical Weapons (OPCW)
Organization of American States (OAS)
United Nations (UN)
United Nations Conference on Trade and Development (UNCTAD)
United Nations Educational, Scientific, and Cultural Organization (UNESCO)
United Nations Industrial Development Organization (UNIDO)
Universal Postal Union (UPU)
World Customs Organization (WCO)
World Federation of Trade Unions (WFTU)
World Health Organization (WHO)
World Intellectual Property Organization (WIPO)
World Meteorological Organization (WMO)
World Trade Organization (WTO)

Law and order in Barbados 

Law of Barbados
 Constitution of Barbados
 Crime in Barbados
 Human trafficking in Barbados
 Human rights in Barbados
 LGBT rights in Barbados
 Law enforcement in Barbados

Military of Barbados 

Military of Barbados
 Command
 Commander-in-chief
 Barbados Defence Force
 Barbados Coast Guard
 Army of Barbados
 Navy of Barbados
 Military history of Barbados
 Military ranks of Barbados
 Project HARP

Local government in Barbados 

Local government in Barbados
 Constituency Councils

History of Barbados 

History of Barbados
Timeline of Barbadian history
Current events of Barbados
 Military history of Barbados

Culture of Barbados 

Culture of Barbados
 Barbados Lottery
 Cuisine of Barbados
 Languages of Barbados
 English in Barbados
 English place names in Barbados
 Media in Barbados
 Newspapers in Barbados
 Radio stations in Barbados
 Television in Barbados
 National symbols of Barbados
 Coat of arms of Barbados
 Flag of Barbados
 National anthem of Barbados
 People of Barbados
 Public holidays in Barbados
 Religion in Barbados
 Anglican Church of Barbados
 Hinduism in Barbados
 Islam in Barbados
 Judaism in Barbados
 History of the Jews in Barbados
 Scouting and Guiding in Barbados
 Barbados Boy Scouts Association
 The Girl Guides Association of Barbados
 World Heritage Sites in Barbados:
 Bridgetown
 George Washington House (Barbados)
 Morgan Lewis Windmill
 Nidhe Israel Synagogue

Arts and entertainment in Barbados 
 Beauty pageants in Barbados
 Miss Barbados Universe
 Miss Barbados World

Art in Barbados 
 Music of Barbados
 Music history of Barbados
 Barbados Chamber Orchestra
 Barbados Jazz Festival
 Royal Barbados Police Band

Sports in Barbados 

Sports in Barbados
 Cricket in Barbados
 Barbados Cricket Association
 Barbados Cricket Buckle
 Barbados national cricket team
 Cycling in Barbados
 Barbados Cycling Union
 Football in Barbados
 Barbados Football Association
 Barbados national football team
 Barbados national football team results
 Netball in Barbados
 Barbados national netball team
 Rugby in Barbados
 Barbados national rugby union team
 Volleyball in Barbados
 Barbados men's national volleyball team
 Barbados at international sports competitions
 Barbados at the Commonwealth Games
 Barbados at the 2006 Commonwealth Games
 Barbados at the 2010 Commonwealth Games
 Barbados at the Pan American Games
 Barbados at the 1991 Pan American Games
 Barbados at the 1995 Pan American Games
 Barbados at the 1999 Pan American Games
 Barbados at the 2003 Pan American Games
 Barbados at the 2007 Pan American Games
 Barbados at the 2011 Pan American Games
 Barbados at the Paralympics
 Barbados at the 2000 Summer Paralympics
 Barbados at the 2008 Summer Paralympics
 Barbados at the Olympics
 Barbados at the 1968 Summer Olympics
 Barbados at the 1972 Summer Olympics
 Barbados at the 1976 Summer Olympics
 Barbados at the 1984 Summer Olympics
 Barbados at the 1988 Summer Olympics
 Barbados at the 1992 Summer Olympics
 Barbados at the 1996 Summer Olympics
 Barbados at the 2000 Summer Olympics
 Barbados at the 2004 Summer Olympics
 Barbados at the 2008 Summer Olympics
 Barbados at the 2012 Summer Olympics
 Other international sports competitions
 Barbados at the 2009 World Championships in Athletics
 Barbados at the 2010 Central American and Caribbean Games
 Barbados at the 2010 Summer Youth Olympics
 Barbados at the 2011 World Aquatics Championships
 Barbados at the 2011 World Championships in Athletics
 Other
 Barbados Davis Cup team
 Barbados FA Cup
 Barbados Fed Cup team
 Barbados First Division
 Barbados Gold Cup
 Barbados National Stadium
 2010 Barbados Premier Division
 2011 Barbados Premier Division
 Association football in Barbados
 Barbados Olympic Association
 Barbados Premier Division
 Barbados women's national football team
 Barbados women's national rugby union team
 Barbados women's national volleyball team
 Carlton Cricket Club (Barbados)
 List of football clubs in Barbados
 List of international cricketers from Barbados
 Rugby union in Barbados
 Technico (Barbados football club)

Economy and infrastructure of Barbados 

Economy of Barbados
 Economic rank, by nominal GDP (2007): 144th (one hundred and forty fourth)
 Banking in Barbados
 Central Bank of Barbados
 Communications in Barbados
 Internet in Barbados
 Companies of Barbados
Currency of Barbados: Dollar
ISO 4217: BBD
 Barbados Stock Exchange
 List of companies listed on the Barbados Stock Exchange
 Tourism in Barbados
 Visa policy of Barbados
 Transport in Barbados
 Air transport in Barbados
 Airlines of Barbados
 Airports in Barbados
 Port of Bridgetown

Education in Barbados 

Education in Barbados
 Schools in Barbados

Health in Barbados 
 Hospitals in Barbados

See also

Barbados

Index of Barbados-related articles
List of Barbados-related topics
List of international rankings
Member state of the Commonwealth of Nations
Member state of the United Nations
Outline of geography
Outline of North America
 Monarchy of Barbados
 1831 Barbados hurricane
 Amateur radio call signs of Barbados
 Bahá'í Faith in Barbados
 Banks Barbados Brewery
 Barbados (band)
 Barbados (composition)
 Barbados (Typically Tropical song)
 Barbados and CARICOM
 Barbados anole
 Barbados Association for Children With Intellectual Challenges
 Barbados Blackbelly sheep
 Barbados bullfinch
 Barbados Civil Aviation Department
 Barbados Defence Force Sports Program
 Barbados Holetown Festival
 Barbados Independence Act 1966
 Barbados Joe Walcott
 Barbados leaf-toed gecko
 Barbados Light and Power Company
 Barbados lottery
 Barbados Museum & Historical Society
 Barbados National Archives
 Barbados National Oil Company Limited
 Barbados National Pledge
 Barbados National Trust
 Barbados national under-23 football team
 Barbados nationality law
 Barbados passport
 Barbados Police Headquarters
 Barbados Port Incorporated
 Barbados Programme of Action
 Barbados raccoon
 Barbados racer
 Barbados rail
 Barbados Red Cross Society
 Barbados Regiment
 Barbados Sky
 Barbados Slave Code
 Barbados Stock Exchange
 Barbados threadsnake
 Barbados Transport Board
 Barbados Triple Crown of Thoroughbred Racing
 Barbados v. Trinidad and Tobago
 Barbados Water Authority
 Barbados Wildlife Reserve
 Barbados Workers' Union
 Battle off Barbados
 Bishop of Barbados
 CBC Radio (Barbados)
 CBC TV 8 (Barbados)
 Codrington School (Barbados)
 Congress of Trade Unions and Staff Associations of Barbados
 David Bentley (Bishop of Barbados)
 DGM Barbados Open
 Douglas Lynch (Barbados)
 Foundation School (Barbados)
 Freemasonry in Barbados
 George Washington House (Barbados)
 Governor-General of Barbados
 Harrison College (Barbados)
 High Commission of Barbados, Ottawa
 Immigration to Barbados
 Index of Barbados-related articles
 Indian River (Barbados)
 Indians in Barbados
 Industrial heritage of Barbados
 Institute of Chartered Accountants of Barbados
 Knight or Dame of St. Andrew (Barbados)
 Landship (Barbados)
 List of Governors of Barbados
 List of High Commissioners of the United Kingdom to Barbados
 List of people on stamps of Barbados
 List of plantations in Barbados
 List of speakers of the House of Assembly of Barbados
 Long Pond River (Barbados)
 Mártires de Barbados Stadium
 Multi-Choice TV (Barbados)
 Music history of Barbados
 National Library Service of Barbados
 Order of Barbados
 Parkinson Memorial Secondary School (Barbados)
 Pelican Island (Barbados)
 Quality FM (Barbados)
 Queen's College (Barbados)
 Royal Barbados Police Band
 Sheraton Centre (Barbados)
 Sherbrooke (Barbados)
 Shipping Association of Barbados
 Silver Sands (Barbados football club)
 Table of precedence for Barbados
 The Barbados Advocate
 The Daily Nation (Barbados)
 The One 98.1 FM (Barbados)
 The Ursuline Convent (Barbados)
 To Hell or Barbados
 Voice of Barbados
 William Douglas (Barbados)
 Republicanism in Barbados
 List of prime ministers of Barbados
 Senate of Barbados
 Members of the Senate of Barbados
 House of Assembly of Barbados
 List of presidents of the Legislative Council of Barbados
 List of presidents of the Senate of Barbados
 Supreme Court of Judicature (Barbados)
 United States Ambassador to Barbados
 United States Ambassador to Barbados and the Eastern Caribbean
 Royal Barbados Police Force
 Postage stamps and postal history of Barbados
 Postal codes in Barbados
 Telecommunications in Barbados
 TeleBarbados
 Highways in Barbados
 Vehicle registration plates of Barbados

References

External links

Barbados Government - official website
Barbados Cricket Association
Barbados Investment and Development Corporation
Barbados Museum & Historical Society
Barbados Statistical Service (BSS)
Barbados Tourism Authority - The Ministry of Tourism
Central Bank of Barbados website
Parliament of Barbados official website
Parliament of Barbados - Some facts about Barbados

Barbados
Barbados
Outline